Woodbury is a hamlet and census-designated place (CDP) located within the Town of Oyster Bay in Nassau County, on Long Island, in New York, United States. The population was 8,907 at the 2010 census.

Woodbury borders Laurel Hollow to the north, Plainview to the south, Syosset to the west, and Cold Spring Harbor, West Hills and South Huntington to the east. Woodbury is located approximately 35 miles (57 km) east of Midtown Manhattan.

Geography

The ZIP Code of the Woodbury Post Office is 11797.

Demographics
As of the census of 2000, there were 9,010 people, 2,851 households, and 2,297 families residing in the CDP. The population density was 1,781.9 per square mile (687.5/km2). There were 2,895 housing units at an average density of 572.5/sq mi (220.9/km2). The racial makeup of the CDP was 90.87% White, 0.98% African American, 0.06% Native American, 7.06% Asian, 0.01% Pacific Islander, 0.28% from other races, and 0.75% from two or more races. Hispanic or Latino of any race were 1.42% of the population.

There were 2,851 households, out of which 39.2% had children under the age of 18 living with them, 72.6% were married couples living together, 6.5% had a female householder with no husband present, and 19.4% were non-families. 16.9% of all households were made up of individuals, and 7.0% had someone living alone who was 65 years of age or older. The average household size was 2.82 and the average family size was 3.18.

In the CDP, the population was spread out, with 24.7% under the age of 18, 4.2% from 18 to 24, 23.4% from 25 to 44, 26.7% from 45 to 64, and 21.0% who were 65 years of age or older. The median age was 44 years. For every 100 females, there were 87.9 males. For every 100 females age 18 and over, there were 80.0 males.

The median income for a household in the CDP was $122,643, and the median income for a family was $139,409. Males had a median income of $100,000 versus $51,506 for females. The per capita income for the CDP was $58,316. About 2.6% of families and 3.3% of the population were below the poverty line, including 3.0% of those under age 18 and 7.1% of those age 65 or over. Per City-data.com, the average adjusted gross income (AGI) in 2012 was $234,485 for a household on Woodbury, Long Island. The most updated AGI from 2021 was around $280,000 for the average household in Woodbury.

Education
Woodbury is located within the boundaries of (and is thus served by) the Syosset Central School District. Children who reside within the hamlet and go to public schools attend Syosset's schools with students from Syosset, Muttontown, and Oyster Bay Cove, as well as parts of Jericho, Laurel Hollow, Plainview and Hicksville.

Notable people
 Ed Newman (born 1951) – National Football League All-Pro football player.
 Tracy Pollan – Actress.
 Ogden Mills (December 18, 1856 - January 29, 1929) – American financier and Thoroughbred racehorse owner.
 Joshua Lafazan – Politician.
 Ogden Livingston Mills (August 23, 1884 – October 11, 1937) – American lawyer, businessman and politician. He served as United States Secretary of the Treasury in President Herbert Hoover's cabinet.[1][2]
 Jon Lovett (born August 17, 1982) – American screenwriter, speechwriter, television producer, and podcaster. He served as a speech and joke writer for President Barack Obama and Hillary Clinton.

References

Oyster Bay (town), New York
Census-designated places in New York (state)
Hamlets in New York (state)
Census-designated places in Nassau County, New York
Hamlets in Nassau County, New York